Resistance Records was a Canadian record label owned by Resistance LLC which was closely connected to the organization National Alliance. It produced and sold music by neo-Nazi and white separatist musicians, primarily through its website. Advertising itself as "The Soundtrack for White Revolution", Resistance LLC also published a magazine called Resistance, with Erich Gliebe becoming the editor in 1999. The label is listed as a hate group by the Southern Poverty Law Center. As of 2011, the label was headquartered in Lufkin, Texas, US.

History
The label was founded in Windsor, Ontario in December 1993 by white supremacist George Burdi. George Burdi went by the name "George Eric Hawthorne" at that time. In January 1994, this music label was also incorporated in Detroit, Michigan. With the launch of a new music label came the new magazine Resistance. The magazine boasted a circulation of over 13,000 in 1995. This magazine is still published and distributed by the National Alliance. 
Among the acts signed to Resistance was Burdi's own RAHOWA (short for "Racial Holy War"), which disbanded after Burdi renounced neo-Nazism.

Burdi was involved in a white supremacist street march in May 1993, during which he kicked a female anti-racist protester in the face. Burdi was charged for assault causing bodily harm in 1995, and given a 12-month sentence. He was arrested after losing appeals and served time for the assault in 1997. Burdi's Canadian business partners, Jason Snow and Joe Talic, had taken control and ownership of Resistance in 1996. American manager Mark Wilson was later replaced by Eric Davidson, former editor of the North American edition of the UK network Blood & Honour, who had relocated from California to Michigan in January 1997.

In April 1997, Resistance Records was temporarily put out of business by a tax dispute and a prosecution for distributing materials that promoted hatred in Canada. The inventory was in the United States at that time, at a rented house in Milford, Michigan where the operations were run. The Federal Marshals, under the direction of the Internal Revenue Service, seized the company records and the entire inventory. Eventually a small fine was paid for failure to properly pay state sales tax, and the business records and inventory was returned. The label never again operated in Canada because of violations of Canadian hate speech laws. After his 1997 sentence, George Burdi renounced racism and formed an ethnically diverse band, Novacosm.

In 1998, Resistance Records was sold by its Canadian owners to Willis Carto and was incorporated in Washington, D.C., with Carto's agent Todd Blodgett in charge of operations. Eric Davidson gave notice after the sale and would later relocate to Minnesota to help found Panzerfaust Records. For a brief time, Resistance Records operated from California. Blodgett and William Luther Pierce, head of the National Alliance had bought partial ownership. In 1999, Carto and Blodgett later sold their shares of the company to Pierce. Pierce fired Blodgett and moved the entire operation to his  property in Hillsboro, West Virginia. Also in 1999, Resistance Records bought Swedish white power label Nordland Records, doubling its roster. 
In 2000, it was made into an LLC in West Virginia.

Subsidiaries
Resistance Records owns several smaller labels, most notably black metal labels Cymophane Records (also known as Cymophane Productions) and Unholy Records. It is a front for Cymophane Records, which was purchased by the National Alliance, mainly to gain the rights to distribute Burzum albums in the United States. The label has also released albums by Nocturnal Fear and Nachtmystium, which are not National Socialist black metal (NSBM) bands. The label is managed by Ymir G. Winter, who plays guitar in Grom, a New York-based NSBM band.

At one time, Resistance Records operated a web-based radio station, Resistance Radio, which streamed white power music across the Internet 24 hours a day.

Merchandise
Resistance Records maintained an online store that sold over 1,000 CDs, as well as clothes, flags and two computer games they developed, Ethnic Cleansing and White Law, which were only available for purchase from their website.

In Ethnic Cleansing, the player can choose to play as either a Nazi skinhead or a Klansman who runs through a ghetto killing Africans and mestizos, before descending into a subway system to murder Jews. Eventually the player reaches a "Jewish Control Center", where Ariel Sharon, the former prime minister of Israel, is directing plans for Jewish world domination. The player must kill Sharon to win the game. The game has several music tracks to choose from, and there is a small video loop of William Luther Pierce's speech displayed in the game. The game was largely ignored by the gaming community and the specialized press.

In the sequel, White Law, the player is an ex-police officer, dismissed because of his political views. The player runs through several buildings, killing people such as police officers, a child pornographer and journalists. The player must kill the police chief to win the game.

See also
 List of record labels

References

External links
 Official site  (defunct)
 Cymophane Productions

1993 establishments in Ontario
American independent record labels
Canadian independent record labels
Conspiracist media
History of racism in Texas
Holocaust denial in Canada
Holocaust denial in the United States
National Socialist black metal
Neo-Nazi record labels
Neo-Nazism in Canada
Neo-Nazism in the United States
Record labels established in 1993
White nationalism in Texas
White separatism